The Asia Foundation is a nonprofit international development organization committed to "improving lives across a dynamic and developing Asia". The Asia Foundation (TAF) was established in 1954 to undertake cultural and educational activities on behalf of the United States Government in ways not open to official U.S. agencies. Headquartered in San Francisco, The Asia Foundation works through a network of 18 offices in 18 Asian countries and in Washington, DC.

The foundation's predecessor, Committee For Free Asia, was founded in 1951 as a CIA operation. It is no longer affiliated with the CIA, its name was changed to The Asia Foundation in 1954. Today, The Asia Foundation is a nonprofit 501(c)(3) organization that receives the majority of its funding ($91,837,660 in 2019) from United States Government grants.

On January 1, 2011, David D. Arnold took over as president of the foundation.

Impact

 Providing 50 million books to tens of thousands of schools, libraries, and universities. 
 Organizing nationwide election monitoring and voter education to ensure free and fair elections and strengthen democracy in virtually every Asian country that has undergone a democratic transition over the past six decades.
 Educating more than a million migrant workers in over one thousand factories in China's Pearl River Delta on their legal rights, safety, and personal health. 
 Protecting the basic rights of women to counter human trafficking, fight gender-based violence, increase political participation, and strengthen legal systems. 
 Providing life-changing professional opportunities for newly emerging Asian leaders. 
 Reducing the human and financial toll of natural disasters by equipping government officials, businesses, and community leaders in disaster planning and response.
 Creating jobs by improving the business climate and reducing red tape for local entrepreneurs and small businesses.
 Reducing violence through peacebuilding efforts in some of the most entrenched conflict zones in the region, including Southern Thailand, Pakistan, Mindanao, and Sri Lanka. 
 Conducting ground-breaking empirical surveys to assess the quality and responsiveness of government services, patterns of corruption, and levels of violence, including the most comprehensive public opinion poll in Afghanistan.

Global presence
The Asia Foundation addresses issues on both a country and regional level through a network of 18 offices around the world. In cooperation with local partners in government and civil society, the foundation's international and local staff provide insight and program on a variety of development challenges. Besides its headquarters in San Francisco and an office in Washington, D.C., it has a presence in the following Asian nations:

 Afghanistan
 Bangladesh
 Cambodia
 China
 East Timor
 Hong Kong
 India
 Indonesia
 Japan
 Korea
 Laos
 Malaysia
 Mongolia
 Myanmar
 Nepal
 Pacific Islands
 Pakistan
 Philippines
 Singapore
 Sri Lanka
 Taiwan
 Thailand
 Vietnam

Program areas

Governance and law
The Asia Foundation's largest program area – governance and law – develops and supports initiatives that build more effective and responsive governance in Asia. The foundation cooperates with a broad network of partners in government, civil society, and the private sector to improve governing institutions in order to help accelerate economic and social change, reduce corruption, manage conflict, and increase citizen participation.

Its sub-programming areas include:

 Governance (local/municipal governance, counter corruption, central executive institutions, parliamentary development, constitutional development)
 Law and Justice (strengthening and reform of formal and informal law and justice mechanisms, supporting efforts to increased community safety and security, particularly through community-oriented policing, and programs aimed specifically at empowering and protecting the rights of marginalized populations)
 Conflict and Fragile Conditions (subnational conflict, peacebuilding, and civil military relations) 
 Elections (free and fair elections and democratic practice, open flows of information, and political parties)

Women's empowerment
While women in Asia have made steady gains in recent years, gender inequality remains a significant problem. For 60 years, The Asia Foundation has supported women and girls across the Asia-Pacific region. Its Women's Empowerment Program was established in 1994 and has transformed the lives of thousands of women and girls through significant programs that focus on three key areas: expanding women's economic opportunities, increasing women's personal rights and security, and advancing women's political participation. The foundation supports an integrated and coordinated approach that integrates gender into its work in governance, economic development, regional cooperation, and the environment.

Economic development
The foundation's Economic Development programs support Asian initiatives to enhance economic governance to accelerate and sustain inclusive economic growth and broaden economic opportunities through design and implementation in three core program areas: 1) improving the business environment for private sector growth, 2) advancing regional economic cooperation, and 3) supporting entrepreneurship development.

The foundation works with local partners to design and implement program activities focusing on promoting investment and private enterprises, inclusive and equitable growth, empowering entrepreneurs and fostering intra and inter-regional trade by removing non-tariff barriers and strengthening domestic demand.
Economic Development Impacts:

The Asia Foundation has developed a set of research tools, like the Economic Governance Indices (EGIs), Business Climate Barometers, and Regulatory Impact Assessments, which measure the quality of local business environments and the costs associated with poor policies. By identifying the strengths and weaknesses of business environments, local business owners and public officials are better able to identify and address specific areas for improvement. To date, the foundation has developed EGIs in Bangladesh, Vietnam, Sri Lanka, Cambodia, and Indonesia.
The Asia Foundation has facilitated multi-stakeholder public-private coalitions to address issues hindering economic and business growth, such as business forums to secure access to credit for entrepreneurs in Bangladesh, dialogues to simplify business licensing processes and reductions in local taxes and informal fees in Cambodia, and a regional forum to support Small and Medium Enterprises (SMEs) for regional integration in South-East Asia.

Books for Asia

Since 1954, Books for Asia has donated more than 40 million books to libraries in dozens of Asian countries. In 2006 alone, Books for Asia donated 920,000 books and educational materials valued at $30 million to schools and educational institutions in 15 countries.

In 2005, Books for Asia's donations had a special focus on communities affected by the Asian tsunami in December 2004. Donations from publisher Scholastic, Inc., and a timely endorsement by the Association of American Publishers, helped Books for Asia respond to the urgent need for books in schools and libraries in Sri Lanka and Thailand that were devastated by the disaster.

Exchanges
Through its Asian American Exchange unit, The Asia Foundation seeks to encourage greater understanding between Asians and Americans with the ultimate aim of contributing toward strengthened U.S.-Asia relations. Programs include:

The foundation's Asian Perspectives Series and Emerging Issues Series brought Asian civil society leaders and policymakers to Washington, D.C. to discuss vital issues across the region.
The foundation's Ellsworth Bunker Asian Ambassadors Series, also organized by the foundation's Washington office, brought together ambassadors from Asia and select U.S. government, business, policy, and media leaders.
The Asia Foundation also continued its 30-year partnership with the Henry Luce Foundation to administer an internship program for young Americans with leadership potential. Since 1974, the Asia Foundation has developed and overseen placements for more than 700 Luce Scholars in East and Southeast Asia.

Environment
The Asia Foundation's Environment program supports Asian initiatives to ensure the sustainability of the environment and natural resources critical to Asia's development and future well-being. The foundation works with a broad range of local stakeholders including civil society, government, and the private sector to strengthen the institutions and processes through which environmental resources are managed, and to improve environmental policy.  Areas where the foundation is having an impact in Asia include: advancing responsible mining and natural resource management in Mongolia; increasing public participation and transparency in environmental decision-making in China; and preparing for natural disasters and climate change in the Pacific Islands, among others.

Regional cooperation
The Asia Foundation's Regional Cooperation program works to strengthen relations among Asian nations and their peoples in the effort to foster peace, stability, prosperity, and effective governance. Its focus includes fostering regional cooperation on critical issues in Southeast, Northeast, and South Asia; foreign policy capacity-building in select countries in developing Asia; providing life-changing opportunities for emerging leaders in the region; and facilitating policy dialogues on Asian affairs and U.S.-Asian relations in Washington.

Origins

"The Asia Foundation (TAF), a Central Intelligence Agency proprietary, was established in 1954 to undertake cultural and educational activities on behalf of the United States Government in ways not open to official U.S. agencies."

The Asia Foundation is an outgrowth of the Committee for a Free Asia, which was founded by the U.S. government in 1951. CIA funding and support of the Committee for a Free Asia and the Asia Foundation were assigned the CIA code name "Project DTPILLAR".

In 1954, the Committee for a Free Asia was renamed the Asia Foundation (TAF) and incorporated in California as a private, nominally non-governmental organization devoted to promoting democracy, rule of law, and market-based development in post-war Asia.

In the 1950s, the Asia Foundation "clandestinely supported anti-Communist motion picture industry personnel, ranging from producers, directors, and technicians to critics, writers, and general intellectuals in many parts of Asia".

Among the original founding officers of the board, there were several presidents/chairmen of large companies including T.S. Peterson, CEO of Standard Oil of California (now Chevron), Brayton Wilbur, president of Wilbur-Ellis Co., and J.D. Zellerbach, chairman of the Crown Zellerbach Corporation; four university presidents including Grayson Kirk from Columbia, J.E. Wallace Sterling of Stanford, and Raymond Allen from UCLA; prominent attorneys including Turner McBaine and A. Crawford Greene; Pulitzer Prize-winning writer James Michener; Paul Hoffman, the first administrator of the Marshall Plan in Europe; and several major figures in foreign affairs.

In 1966, Ramparts revealed that the CIA was covertly funding a number of organizations, including the Asia Foundation. A commission authorized by President Johnson and led by Secretary of State Rusk determined that the Asia Foundation should be preserved and overtly funded by the US government. Following this change, The Asia Foundation was classified as a private, nonprofit, nongovernmental organization under the section 501(c)(3) of the Internal Revenue Code. The foundation began to restructure its programming, shifting away from its earlier goals of "building democratic institutions and encouraging the development of democratic leadership" toward an emphasis on Asian development as a whole (CRS 1983).

Board of Trustees

Officers of the Board of Trustees 
 Sunder Ramaswamy, Chair of the Board and Executive Committee
 S. Timothy Kochis, Vice Chair of the Board and Executive Committee
 Kathleen Stephens, Vice Chair of the Board and Executive Committee
 Daniel F. Feldman, Treasurer of the Board and Executive Committee
 Teresita C. Schaffer, Secretary of the Board and Executive Committee
 David D. Arnold, President and Chief Executive Officer
 Suzanne E. Siskel, Executive Vice President and Chief Operating Officer
 Gordon Hein, Senior Vice President, Programs
 Nancy Yuan, Senior Vice President and Director, Washington, D.C.
 Ken Krug, Vice President, Finance and Chief Financial Officer
 Amy Ovalle, Vice President, Global Communications
 Mandy Au Yeung, Assistant Secretary to the Board of Trustees

Members of the Board of Trustees 

 Terrence B. Adamson
 William L. Ball
 Howard L. Berman
 Robert O. Blake Jr.
 Jerome L. Dodson
 Elizabeth Economy
 Karl Eikenberry
 Ted Eliot III
 Daniel F. Feldman
 Winnie C. Feng
 Jared Frost
 Michael J. Green
 Noeleen Heyzer
 Karl F. Inderfurth
 Stephen Kahng
 Markos Kounalakis
 Mark W. Lippert
 Clare Lockhart
 Patricia M. Loui
 Meredith Ludlow
 James D. McCool
 Janet Montag
 Moon Kook-Hyun
 Lauren Kahea Moriarty
 Adil Najam
 William H. Neukom
 Dustin Palmer
 Iromi Perera
 Ruby Shang
 Masako H. Shinn
 Deanne Weir

Philanthropy

In 2006, the Asia Foundation provided more than $53 million in program support and distributed 920,000 books and educational materials valued at $30 million throughout Asia.

References

External links
Official website of the Asia Foundation
Asia Foundation Records at the Hoover Institution Archives

 
Asian studies
Central Intelligence Agency front organizations
Charities based in California
Development charities based in the United States